The Lower Similkameen Indian Band or Lower Smelqmix, is a First Nations band government in the Canadian province of British Columbia.  Their office is located in the village of Keremeos in the Similkameen region.  They are a member of the Okanagan Nation Alliance.

Population
The band's registered population is 500 with 209 band members living off-reserve.

Indian reserves

Indian reserves under the band's administration are:  
Alexis Indian Reserve No. 9, on the left bank of the Similkameen River 4 miles west of Keremeos, 168.70 ha.  
Ashnola Indian Reserve No. 10, on the right bank of the Similkameen River at its junction with the Ashnola River, 3415 ha. 
Blind Creek Indian Reserve No. 6, on Blind Creek, 4 miles southeast of Keremeos, 161 ha. 
Blind Creek Indian Reserve No. 6A, west of Barcelo Road, 1 mile west of IR No. 6, 0.10 ha. 
Chopaka Indian Reserve Nos. 7 & 8, on the right bank of the Similkameen River, north of and adjoining the international boundary, 1537.80 ha.  These two reserves are the most populated of the band's reserves.  
Keremeos Forks Indian Reserve Nos. 12 & 12A, on Keremeos Creek at mouth of Marset Creek, 7 miles north of Keremeos, 954.10 ha.  
Lower Similkameen Indian Reserve No. 2, on the Similkameen River 6 miles southeast of Keremeos, 1293.70 ha. 
Narcisse's Farm Indian Reserve No. 4, on right bank of the Similkameen River 5 miles southeast of Keremeos, 750.30 ha. 
Range Indian Reserve No. 13, west of Narcisse's Farm IR No. 4, on left bank of Susap Creek, 6768.10 ha.

See also
Okanagan people

References

Syilx governments
Similkameen Country